Humberto Elizondo Kauffman (born June 19, 1947)  is a Mexican actor of film and television, the son of Mexican diplomat Humberto Elizondo Alardine and Canadian actress Fannie Kauffman. Currently, he portrays Aquiles Trueba in Un refugio para el amor.

Filmography

Film

Veinticuatro horas de vida (1969) .... (uncredited)
La hermana dinamita (1970) .... Invitado en fiesta
El diablo en persona (1973) .... Delfino
El tigre de Santa Julia (1974) .... Campesino herido (uncredited)
Los vampiros de Coyoacán (1974) .... Ticket clerk (uncredited)
Zona roja (1976)
El mexicano (1977)
Mil caminos tiene la muerte (1977) .... Crooked detective
Las mariposas disecadas (1978)
El arracadas (1978) .... Huesos
Muerte a sangre fría (1978)
El circo de Capulina (1978)
No tiene la culpa el Indio (1978) .... Mozo Hotel
Llámenme Mike (1979) .... Rampazo
Un cura de locura (1979)
El valiente vive... hasta que el cobarde quiere (1979) .... Martín
Bloody Marlene (1979) .... Sherriff I
Pasión por el peligro (1979)
El futbolista fenómeno (1979) .... Extraterrestre
Midnight Dolls (1979)
Las golfas del talón (1979)
El Año de la Peste (1979) .... R. C. Jiménez, reportero
Perro callejero (1980)
El siete vidas (1980)
Las tentadoras (1980)
Mírame con ojos pornográficos (1980) .... Vendedor
Persecución y muerte de Benjamín Argumedo (1980)
Los mantenidos (1980)
El preso No. 9 (1981)
Perro callejero II (1981) .... Chava
El gran triunfo (1981)
El gran perro muerto (1981) .... Cabo Valdemar
Ni modo... así somos (1981)
Como México no hay dos (1981) .... Miguel
Las siete cucas (1981)
Solo para damas (1981)
La muerte del Palomo (1981)
El rey de los albures (1982)
Juan Charrasqueado y Gabino Barrera, su verdadera historia (1982)
Cosa fácil (1982) .... Cuervo Valdivia
El Bronco (1982)
El anima de Sayula (1982)
Me lleva la tristeza (1983)
Eréndira (1983) .... Blacaman
Dos de abajo (1983) .... Teniente
Buenas, y con... movidas (1983)
Por un vestido de novia (1983)
Escuela de placer (1984)
Siempre en domingo (1984) .... Humberto
Dune (1984) .... Czigo (uncredited)
Gatilleros del Rio Bravo (1984) .... Figurin
El otro (1984)
El judicial (1984)
Historias violentas (1985) .... (segment 5 "Noche de paz")
Más vale pájaro en mano (1985)
El rey de la vecindad (1985) .... Marcos
Salvador (1986) .... Road Block Thug
El cafre (1986) .... Policía
Huele a gas (1986)
El hijo de Pedro Navaja (1986) .... Filos
Yako, cazador de malditos (1986) .... El 'Zargo'
Un hombre violento (1986)
Tierra de rencores (1986) .... Epifanio
Ratas de la ciudad (1986)
Mentiras (1986) .... Don Gabriel
La leyenda del Manco (1987)
El macho (1987)
Don't panic (1987) .... T.V. Reporter
Los plomeros y las ficheras (1988)
Pancho el Sancho (1988)
Sabado D.F. (1988)
Los hermanos machorro (1988)
Los albureros (1988) .... El Mamey
Central camionera (1988)
Licence to Kill (1989) .... Hotel Assistant Manager
Los rateros (1989)
Te gustan, te las traspaso (1989)
Si mi cama hablara (1989)
Rosa de dos aromas (1989) .... Molina
La muerte del portero (1989)
Fiesta de sangre (1989)

Arriba el telón
El mofles en Acapulco (1990)
Dos cuates a todo dar (1990)
Sentencia de muerte (1990)
Secta satanica: El enviado del Sr. (1990)
No hay quinto malo (1990)
La chica del alacrán de oro (1990)
Brutalidad judicial (1990)
Hembra o macho (1991)
Burbujas de amor (1991)
Desvestidas y alborotadas (1991)
Tijeras de papel (1991)
Sabueso (1991)
Polvo de muerte (1991)
Federal de narcoticos (Division Cobra) (1991)
Traficantes de niños (1992)
El secuestro de un periodista (1992) .... Lic. Arnaiz
Imperio blanco (1992)
Culpable o inocente (1993)
Gunmen (1993) .... Guzman
Amor a la medida (1993) .... Ernesto Franco
Suerte en la vida (La Lotería III) (1994)
El aguinaldo (1997)
The Mask of Zorro (1998) .... Don Julio
Soy el jefe de jefes (1998)
La venganza del viejito (1998)
El cuervo (1998)
Soy el jefe de jefes (1999)
Reclusorio III (1999)
Bandidas (2006) .... Governor
Morirse en domingo (2006) .... Calderon
El cártel (2009) .... Pedro Santana
Los Siete (2010) .... Francisco Zuñiga
La cebra (2011) .... Quesada

Television

 Cuna de lobos (1986) .... Inspector Norberto Suárez
 Un rostro en mi pasado (1990) .... Rafael Reyes
 Triángulo (1992) .... Arcadio Villafranca
 Los parientes pobres (1993) .... Paulino Zavala
 El vuelo del águila (1994) .... Manuel Mondragón
 Agujetas de color de rosa (1994) .... Tomás
 La antorcha encendida (1996) .... Hermenegildo Galeana
 La usurpadora (1998) .... Silvano Piña
 Camila (1998) .... Lic. Darío Suárez
 Nunca te olvidaré (1999) .... Fermín Requena
 Cuento de Navidad (1999) .... Samuel
 Carita de ángel (2000) .... Salomón Alvarado
 Abrázame muy fuerte (2000-2001) .... Bernal Orozco
 Salomé (2001) .... Emilio
 Entre el amor y el odio (2002) .... Dr. Ortega
 ¡Vivan los niños! (2002-2003) .... Juez Mazagatos
 Velo de novia (2003) .... Pedro Robletos
 Contra viento y marea (2005) .... Quiñones
 Duelo de pasiones (2006) .... Lic. Mauro Peña
 Tormenta en el paraíso (2007) .... Lic. Alberti
 Mañana es para siempre (2008-2009) .... Agustín Astorga
 La que no podía amar (2011-2012) .... Federico Galván
 Un refugio para el amor (2012) .... Aquiles Trueba Tajonar
 Porque el amor manda (2012-2013) .... Augusto Constante
 Por siempre mi amor (2013-2014) .... Osvaldo de la Riva
 Hasta el fin del mundo (2014-2015) .... Carlos Landa
 Como dice el dicho (2015-2016) .... Ricardo / Don Antonio 
 Simplemente María (2015-2016).... Adolfo Rivapalacio Balaguer
 Sin tu mirada (2018).... Dr. Horacio Zamudio
Mi marido tiene familia (2018) .... Fantasma de la Navidad
 Malverde: el santo patrón (2021) .... Padre Hilario

References

External links

Mexican male film actors
Mexican male television actors
Mexican male telenovela actors
Mexican people of Basque descent
Mexican people of Romanian descent
Mexican people of Canadian descent
Mexican people of Russian descent
Living people
Male actors from Mexico City
1947 births